Syed Husain Zaheer was an Indian chemist, politician and the director general of the Council of Scientific and Industrial Research (CSIR), the largest research and development organisation in India. Prior to taking up the directorship of CSIR, He served as the director of the Indian Institute of Chemical Technology, a division of CSIR, where he established the department of Biochemistry. After his superannuation from CSIR, he chaired the Board of Governors of the Indian Institute of Technology, Kanpur. The Government of India awarded him the third highest civilian honour of the Padma Bhushan, in 1972, for his contributions to science.

In 1951, along with Indra Kishore Kacker, he was the first to synthesize Methaqualone.

References 

Recipients of the Padma Bhushan in trade and industry
20th-century Indian chemists
Council of Scientific and Industrial Research
IIT Kanpur people
Year of birth missing
Year of death missing